DN1A is a national road in Romania connecting Bucharest and Brașov via Ploiești which is  long. It serves as an alternative to the route through the Valea Prahovei (Prahova Valley).

See also
DN1
Roads in Romania
Transport in Romania

References

Roads in Romania